Andy Johnson (born 14 June 1974) is an English former professional rugby league footballer who played in the 1990s and 2000s. He played at club level for Wigan Warriors (Heritage No. 893), Huddersfield Giants, London Broncos, Castleford Tigers (Heritage No. 784) and Salford City Reds. A versatile utility player, Johnson played in a number of positions throughout his career, usually as a centre or a back row forward.

Background
Andy Johnson was born in Wigan, Greater Manchester, England, and as of 2013 he lives with his wife Alex and two sons Jack and James and is raising money to fight Duchenne muscular dystrophy.

Playing career
Andy Johnson joined Wigan aged 17, he won 100 first games by playing in both the backs and the forwards. In 1997 he participated in two Premiership Finals at Old Trafford, Manchester. The same year he played for Wigan Warriors in the World Club Challenge against the Canterbury Bulldogs which ended up with him being the 9th highest scorer. In December 1997, Johnson ruptured an achilles tendon in training, keeping him out for the entirety of 1998's Super League III. In August 1999, Johnson was loaned out to the Huddersfield Giants for the rest of the season.

At the end of the 1999's Super League IV, Johnson and Wigan Warriors' teammate Jon Clarke both signed a two-year deal with London Broncos, re-uniting with former Wigan coach John Monie. He signed a contract with Castleford Tigers in August 2001. He quit playing after suffering an injury which he got 14-months after he signed a two-year contract with the Salford City Reds.

References

External links
London Broncos profile
Andy Johnson Memory Box Search at archive.castigersheritage.com

1974 births
Living people
Castleford Tigers players
English rugby league players
Huddersfield Giants players
London Broncos players
Rugby league centres
Rugby league five-eighths
Rugby league locks
Rugby league second-rows
Rugby league wingers
Rugby league players from Wigan
Salford Red Devils players
Wigan Warriors players